North Somerset is a constituency represented in the House of Commons of the UK Parliament since 2010 by Liam Fox, a Conservative who served as Secretary of State for International Trade, a new position in the Cabinet, from 2016 to 2019.

History
Earlier versions of the seat existed in 1885–1918 and 1950–1983.

First creation
Parliament passed the Redistribution of Seats Act 1885 creating the larger constituency of North Somerset from the 1885 general election, which was later abolished for the 1918 general election.

Second creation
North Somerset was re-established for the 1950 general election, and abolished again for the 1983 general election.

Third creation
Following the review of parliamentary representation in the North Somerset district by the Boundary Commission for England, the former Woodspring constituency was renamed as North Somerset without substantial boundary changes.

Boundaries

1885–1918: The Sessional Divisions of Keynsham, Long Ashton, and Temple Cloud, and the civil parishes of Binegar, Chilcompton, and Midsomer Norton.

1950–1983: The Urban Districts of Keynsham, Norton Radstock, and Portishead, the Rural Districts of Bathavon and Clutton, and part of the Rural District of Long Ashton.

2010–present: The District of North Somerset wards of Backwell, Clevedon Central, Clevedon East, Clevedon North, Clevedon South, Clevedon Walton, Clevedon West, Clevedon Yeo, Easton-in-Gordano, Gordano, Nailsea East, Nailsea North and West, Pill, Portishead Central, Portishead Coast, Portishead East, Portishead Redcliffe Bay, Portishead South and North Weston, Portishead West, Winford, Wraxall and Long Ashton, Wrington, and Yatton.

Constituency profile
This is essentially the former Woodspring seat with a new name. A coastal strip between the Severn Estuary and the M5 motorway includes the towns of Clevedon and Portishead, while inland from the motorway is the town of Nailsea and a predominantly rural area dotted with villages. This is a fairly affluent constituency with average incomes and low proportion of unemployment claimants – about a third of the population commute to work, mostly in Bristol and Bath.

The Woodspring seat returned Conservative MPs, and had been held by Fox since 1992. Fox won the new constituency by nearly 14 percentage points over the Liberal Democrats in 2010, while Labour took second place in 2015 and 2017.

Members of Parliament

Elections

Elections in the 2010s

Elections in the 1970s

Elections in the 1960s

Elections in the 1950s

Election results 1885–1918

Elections in the 1880s

Elections in the 1890s

Elections in the 1900s

Elections in the 1910s 

General Election 1914–15:

Another General Election was required to take place before the end of 1915. The political parties had been making preparations for an election to take place and by July 1914, the following candidates had been selected; 
Liberal: Joseph King
Unionist: J Windsor Levis

See also
List of parliamentary constituencies in Avon

Notes

References

Parliamentary constituencies in South West England
Parliamentary constituencies in Somerset (historic)
Constituencies of the Parliament of the United Kingdom established in 1885
Constituencies of the Parliament of the United Kingdom disestablished in 1918
Constituencies of the Parliament of the United Kingdom established in 1950
Constituencies of the Parliament of the United Kingdom disestablished in 1983
Constituencies of the Parliament of the United Kingdom established in 2010
Politics of North Somerset
Parliamentary constituencies in Somerset